The College Football All-America Team is an honor given annually to the best players of American college football at their respective positions. The original All-America team was the 1889 College Football All-America Team selected by Caspar Whitney and Walter Camp.  In 1950, the National Collegiate Athletic Bureau, which is the National Collegiate Athletic Association's (NCAA) service bureau, compiled the first list of All-Americans including first-team selections on teams created for a national audience that received national circulation with the intent of recognizing selections made from viewpoints that were nationwide.  Since 1952, College Sports Information Directors of America (CoSIDA) has bestowed Academic All-American recognition on male and female athletes in Divisions I, II, and III of the NCAA as well as National Association of Intercollegiate Athletics athletes, covering all NCAA championship sports.

The 2010 College Football All-America Team is composed of the following first teams: Associated Press (AP), Football Writers Association of America (FWAA), American Football Coaches Association (AFCA), Walter Camp Foundation (WCFF), The Sporting News (TSN), Sports Illustrated (SI), Pro Football Weekly (PFW), ESPN, CBS Sports (CBS), College Football News (CFN), Rivals.com, and Scout.com.

Currently, NCAA compiles consensus all-America teams in the sports of Division I-FBS football and Division I men’s basketball using a point system computed from All-America teams named by coaches associations or media sources. The system consists of three points for first team, two points for second team and one point for third team.  Honorable mention and fourth team or lower recognitions are not accorded any points.  Football consensus teams are compiled by position and the player accumulating the most points at each position is named first team consensus all-American.  Currently, the NCAA recognizes All-Americans selected by the AP, AFCA, FWAA, TSN, and the WCFF to determine Consensus All-Americans.

In 2010, there were 10 unanimous All-Americans.

Offense

Quarterback
Andrew Luck, Stanford (PFW)
Kellen Moore, Boise State (FWAA)
Cam Newton, Auburn -- CONSENSUS -- (AFCA, AP, TSN, WCFF, CBS, CFN, ESPN, Rivals.com, Scout.com, SI)

Running back
Kendall Hunter, Oklahoma State -- CONSENSUS -- (AFCA, AP, WCFF, PFW, Scout.com)
LaMichael James, Oregon -- UNANIMOUS -- (AFCA, AP, FWAA, TSN, WCFF, CBS, CFN, ESPN, Rivals.com, Scout.com, SI)
Marcus Lattimore, South Carolina (CFN)
Denard Robinson, Michigan (FWAA)
Jordan Todman, Connecticut (TSN, CBS, ESPN, Rivals.com, SI)

Wide receiver
Justin Blackmon, Oklahoma State -- UNANIMOUS -- (AFCA, AP, FWAA, TSN, WCFF, CBS, CFN, ESPN, PFW, Rivals.com, Scout.com, SI)
Ryan Broyles, Oklahoma -- CONSENSUS -- (AP, FWAA, TSN, WCFF, CBS, CFN, Rivals.com, SI)
A. J. Green, Georgia (PFW)
Alshon Jeffery, South Carolina (AFCA, FWAA, ESPN, Rivals.com, Scout.com)

Tight end
Michael Egnew, Missouri -- CONSENSUS -- (AP, WCFF, CBS, CFN, Scout.com)
Lance Kendricks, Wisconsin -- CONSENSUS -- (AFCA, TSN, PFW, SI)

Tackle

Gabe Carimi, Wisconsin -- UNANIMOUS -- (AFCA, AP, FWAA, TSN, WCFF, CBS, CFN, ESPN, Rivals.com, Scout.com, SI)
Anthony Castonzo, Boston College (CFN, PFW, Scout.com)
Jonathan Martin, Stanford (Scout.com)
Derek Sherrod, Mississippi State (CBS, CFN, Rivals.com)
Nate Solder, Colorado -- CONSENSUS -- (AP, FWAA, TSN, WCFF, ESPN, PFW, SI)
Lee Ziemba, Auburn -- CONSENSUS -- (AFCA, FWAA, WCFF, SI)

Guard
Clint Boling, Georgia (PFW)
Cordy Glenn, Georgia (PFW)
Rodney Hudson, Florida State -- UNANIMOUS -- (AFCA, AP, FWAA, TSN, WCFF, CBS, CFN, ESPN, Rivals.com, Scout.com, SI)
John Moffitt, Wisconsin (AP, CBS, ESPN, Rivals.com)
Stefen Wisniewski, Penn State (AFCA, Scout.com)

Center
Chase Beeler, Stanford -- CONSENSUS -- (AFCA, AP, TSN, CBS, CFN, ESPN, Rivals.com)
Mike Brewster, Ohio State (FWAA)
Jake Kirkpatrick, TCU (TSN, WCFF)
Mike Pouncey, Florida (PFW)

Defense

End
Da'Quan Bowers, Clemson -- UNANIMOUS -- (AFCA, AP, FWAA, TSN, WCFF, CBS, CFN, ESPN, PFW, Rivals.com, Scout.com, SI)
Wayne Daniels, TCU (FWAA)
Ryan Kerrigan, Purdue -- UNANIMOUS -- (AFCA, AP, FWAA, TSN, WCFF, CBS, CFN, ESPN, Rivals.com, Scout.com, SI)
Jabaal Sheard, Pittsburgh (AFCA)
J. J. Watt, Wisconsin (PFW)

Tackle
Adrian Clayborn, Iowa -- CONSENSUS -- (AFCA, WCFF)
Jared Crick, Nebraska (Rivals.com)
Marcell Dareus, Alabama (PFW)
Nick Fairley, Auburn -- CONSENSUS -- (AP, FWAA, TSN, WCFF, CBS, CFN, ESPN, PFW, Rivals.com, Scout.com, SI)
Drake Nevis, LSU (CBS)
Stephen Paea, Oregon State -- CONSENSUS -- (AP, TSN, CFN, ESPN, SI)

Linebacker
Vontaze Burfict, Arizona State (TSN)
Tank Carder, TCU (AFCA, ESPN)
Lavonte David, Nebraska (CBS, Rivals.com)
Mason Foster, Washington (CFN, Rivals.com, Scout.com)
Justin Houston, Georgia (FWAA, PFW)
Nate Irving, North Carolina State (Scout.com, SI)
Greg Jones, Michigan State -- UNANIMOUS -- (AFCA, AP, FWAA, TSN, WCFF, CBS, Scout.com, SI)
Luke Kuechly, Boston College -- UNANIMOUS -- (AFCA, AP, FWAA, TSN, WCFF, CBS, CFN, ESPN, PFW, Rivals.com, Scout.com, SI)
Von Miller, Texas A&M -- CONSENSUS -- (AP, WCFF, ESPN, PFW, Scout.com)
Danny Trevathan, Kentucky (CFN)

Cornerback
Prince Amukamara, Nebraska -- UNANIMOUS -- (AFCA, AP, FWAA, TSN, WCFF, CBS, ESPN, PFW, Rivals.com Scout.com, SI)
Chimdi Chekwa, Ohio State (FWAA, CFN)
Cliff Harris, Oregon (Scout.com)
Jayron Hosley, Virginia Tech (WCFF, Scout.com)
Patrick Peterson, LSU -- UNANIMOUS -- (AFCA, AP, FWAA, TSN, WCFF, CBS, CFN, ESPN, PFW, Rivals.com, Scout.com, SI)
Reggie Rembert, Air Force (AFCA)

Safety
Mark Barron, Alabama (FWAA)
Ahmad Black, Florida (CBS, CFN, Rivals.com)
Quinton Carter, Oklahoma -- CONSENSUS -- (AFCA, AP, ESPN, SI)
Eric Hagg, Nebraska (PFW)
Jaiquawn Jarrett, Temple (PFW)
Tejay Johnson, TCU -- CONSENSUS -- (AP, WCFF, CBS, ESPN, Rivals.com, SI)
Rahim Moore, UCLA (TSN)
Robert Sands, West Virginia (TSN)

Special teams

Kicker
Dan Bailey, Oklahoma State (Scout.com)
Alex Henery, Nebraska (AP, CBS, CFN, ESPN, PFW, Rivals.com, SI)
Danny Hrapmann, Southern Mississippi (WCFF)
Josh Jasper, LSU -- CONSENSUS -- (FWAA, TSN)
Will Snyderwine, Duke (AFCA)

Punter
Drew Butler, Georgia (PFW)
Chas Henry, Florida -- CONSENSUS -- (AP, TSN, WCFF, CBS, CFN, ESPN, Rivals.com, Scout.com, SI)
Kyle Martens, Rice (AFCA)
Quinn Sharp, Oklahoma State (FWAA)

All-purpose / return specialist
Randall Cobb, Kentucky (AP, ESPN, SI)
Cliff Harris, Oregon -- CONSENSUS -- (FWAA, TSN, CBS, ESPN, PFW, Rivals.com, SI)
Jeremy Kerley, TCU (Rivals.com)
Owen Marecic, Stanford (AFCA)
Eric Page, Toledo -- CONSENSUS -- (TSN, WCFF)
Patrick Peterson, LSU (CBS, PFW)
William Powell, Kansas State (CFN)
Shaky Smithson, Utah (WCFF, CFN, Scout.com)

See also
 2010 All-Big 12 Conference football team
 2010 All-Big Ten Conference football team
 2010 All-Pacific-10 Conference football team
 2010 All-SEC football team

Notes

References
NCAA 2010 Consensus First Team All-Americans
AFCA 2010 All-America team
AP 2010 All-America team
FWAA 2010 All-America team
The Sporting News 2010 All-American team
Walter Camp Football Foundation 2010 All-America team
CBS 2010 All-America team
College Football News 2010 All-America team
ESPN 2010 All-America team
Pro Football Weekly 2010 All-America team
Rivals.com 2010 All-America team
Scout.com 2010 All-America team
Sports Illustrated 2010 All-America team
Academic All-American team

All-America Team
College Football All-America Teams